Ahmed Shah Al Wali Bahamani was the ruler of the Bahmani Sultanate from 1 October 1422 to 17 April 1436, and was a great patron of arts and culture. He brought Persian artisans from Iran, including the metal-worker Abdulla-bin-Kaiser, who was the master of Bidriware, the inlaying of zinc alloy with silver and gold.

Reign 
Ahmed Shah's, and his empress's, tomb is located in Ashtur village, Bidar District, and is the subject of an annual urs, or anniversary of death festival.

During the reign of Ahmed Shah, in 1432, the Bahmani capital shifted to Bidar, and Khwaja Bandenawaz (d. 1422), the most well-known Sufi of the Deccan, is supposed to have been one of the causes for this. The Bahmani kings had close ties with Sufi saints, and Ahmed Shah continued the tradition but he was also considered a saint; the only king to be treated as such by his followers. His tomb in the funerary complex of Ashtur, just outside Bidar, is venerated by Muslims, who consider him to be a wali (friend of God). Ahmed Shah's tomb has well-preserved murals and verses from the Quran. Frontline</ref>

Ahmed Shah fought battles against Vijayanagar (1423), Warangal (1424–1425), Malwa (1425–1435), and against Gujarat (1425–1435).<ref>

Beliefs 
He was religiously inclined and fond of Sufi saints. He is referred to by the title Wali.

References

Citations
 8. https://frontline.thehindu.com/arts-and-culture/heritage/article25296303.ece

Bibliography
 

1436 deaths
Bahmani Sultans
Year of birth unknown